¡Tchkung! was an American band from Seattle, Washington, United States, who blended guerrilla theater, "tribal" drumming, and punk ethics.  Their live performances included multiple drummers, violin, didgeridoo, and electric bass, all played to fire breathers and fire eaters, body piercing, and other theatrical scenes. Often compared to Crash Worship, or Crass, the band has been described as "industrial", though "post-industrial" might be more accurate. The band became well known for the conclusions of their shows, which occasionally ended in police raids (such as in Eugene), riots (particularly Seattle's Bumbershoot Festival in 1994,) and street parades in which audience members were encouraged to participate. After the break-up of the band, members (including Wilson and Filastine) went on to form the political marching band Infernal Noise Brigade.  (managed by David Meinert)

Members
James Van Meter (vocals, tape loops, percussion)
KT (vocals, percussion)
Rick Tahoma Wilson (vocals)
Grey Filastine (drums)
Lazlo Onatop (drums)
Steven Miller(bass)
Devon Cecily (vocals, violin, and drums)
J.Sun (bass)
Jason QuestionMark. (didgeridoo, loops)
bq (fire spinner)
Tyson (fire eater)

Discography
 Second EP Cassette-Only
 Third EP Cassette-Only
 Untitled/Dogs and Gears CD, Belltown Records (1995)
 Post-World Handbook CD, Tim/Kerr Records (1996), Mercury Records 
 Incite: Soundtrack for Post-World Insurrection CD, Post World Industries (1998)

References

External links
 Post-World Industries Homepage
 Unofficial ¡TchKunG! Homepage
 Review of Incite
 Filastine official page

American post-punk music groups
Anarcho-punk groups
DIY culture